The Bit Part is a 1987 Australian comedy film directed by Brendan Maher and starring Chris Haywood and Nicole Kidman.

The film never achieved theatrical release and went straight to television.

References

External links

Australian comedy films
1987 comedy films
1987 films
1980s English-language films
1980s Australian films